Vosaroxin (AG-7352, SPC-595, SNS 595, voreloxin) is a topoisomerase II inhibitor causing site-selective DNA damage. It is under phase III clinical trial investigation for acute myelogenous leukemia (AML) and ovarian cancer sponsored by Sunesis.

Mechanism of action
Vosaroxin is a naphthyridine analog of the anticancer quinolone derivatives (AQDs), a class of compounds that has not been used previously for the treatment of cancer. Topoisomerase II enzymes are essential for the survival of eukaryotic cells. Vosaroxin hinders the reunion of topoisomerase II-induced double-strand breaks at selective sites in DNA, resulting in G2 arrest and cell death by apoptosis.

References 

Topoisomerase inhibitors